Edward Cobb may refer to:
Edward Cobb (politician) (1891–1957), English politician
Sir Edward Cobb, 2nd Baronet, of the Cobb baronets
Ned Cobb (1885–1973), American farmer
Ed Cobb (1938–1999), American musician

See also
Cobb (surname)